Ditrigona regularis is a moth in the family Drepanidae. It was described by Warren in 1922. It is found in India (Assam) and Burma.

The wingspan is 15-17.5 mm for males and 16.5–19 mm for females. The fore- and hindwings are brownish white with reddish brown fasciae.

References

Moths described in 1922
Drepaninae
Moths of Asia